The 1901–02 season is the 28th season of competitive football by Rangers.

Overview
Rangers played a total of 22 competitive matches during the 1901–02 season. The club successfully defended the league championship, finishing two points ahead of Celtic. From the eighteen league matches played the team registered thirteen wins.

The Scottish Cup campaign was ended in the semi-final at the hands of Hibernian after a 2–0 home defeat.

Results
All results are written with Rangers' score first.

Scottish League Division One

Scottish Cup

Appearances

See also
 1901–02 in Scottish football
 1901–02 Scottish Cup

Rangers F.C. seasons
Rangers
Scottish football championship-winning seasons